This is a record of Israel's results at the European Baseball Championship. Israel came in fourth in the 2019 European Baseball Championship.

Honors
During the 2016 C-Level qualifier, Dean Kremer was named the Euros’ Most Valuable Pitcher and Simon Rosenbaum was named MVP. During the 2016 B-Level qualifier, Kremer once again won the Most Valuable Pitcher award.

Israel led teams at the 2016 competition in almost every statistic possible during the C-Level qualifiers. They led in hitting with a .309 average, .450 on base percentage, .509 slugging percentage. They also were the leaders in runs with 53, home runs with 9 and hit by pitch with 20. In addition to hitting they led in ERA with 1.05, strikeouts with an average of 11.5 per nine innings, opponents batting average with .140 and fielding percentage of .973. Israel was tied for stolen bases with 23, which Romania led with 26. The only other statistics Israel did not lead in were walks and doubles.

Record

Record by team

2010 European Baseball Championship - Qualifier Pool 3
Israel competed in the qualification for the 2010 European Baseball Championship, in July 2008. Israel went 2-2 and finished in 3rd place, based on the tiebreaker stat of runs against per 9 innings. Israel lost their first two games, against Bulgaria and Croatia, before coming back to win their final two games, against Serbia and Lithuania.

2012 European Baseball Championship - Pool Tel Aviv
Israel competed in the qualification for the 2012 European Baseball Championship. In addition to competing, Israel hosted one of the qualification pools from July 26–29, 2011. Israel was eliminated from the tournament after going 2-1, finishing in second place behind Great Britain who went 3-0. Israel won their first game against Georgia, lost their second game against Great Britain, before coming back to beat Lithuania in their final game. Israel went on to compete in the home/away finals against Great Britain, where they won the first game but lost the second, with Great Britain advancing to the main tournament.

Going into the round, Great Britain was expected to come win, being ranked 21st, followed by Lithuania at 48 and Israel at 57.

2016 European Baseball Championship
Israel competed in the qualification for the 2016 European Baseball Championship.

During the C-Level qualifier, Dean Kremer was named the Euros’ Most Valuable Pitcher. During the two games he pitched, he pitched 13 innings, giving up only 6 hits, no runs, one walk, and struck out 20.

Simon Rosenbaum was named MVP after hitting .529, along with four homeruns, giving him a 1.294 slugging percentage, in addition to scoring ten runs, collecting 10 RBIs and had three stolen bases.

Israel led teams at competition in almost every statistic possible during the C-Level qualifiers. They led in hitting with a .309 average, .450 on base percentage, .509 slugging percentage. They also were the leaders in runs with 53, home runs with 9 and hit by pitch with 20. In addition to hitting they led in ERA with 1.05, strikeouts with an average of 11.5 per nine innings, opponents batting average with .140 and fielding percentage of .973. Israel was tied for stolen bases with 23, which Romania led with 26. The only other statistics Israel did not lead in were walks and doubles.

2016 C-Level qualification 
At the 2016 European Baseball Championship Israel entered the qualification at the C-Level. After finishing in first place during the Group B round, Israel moved on to the C-Level finals. Israel was placed in Group B for the C-Level qualifier, where they won all three games they played, against Slovenia, Finland and Latvia, outscoring their competitors 31-4. Advancing to the C-Level semifinals, Israel faced Romania who they beat 8-3. In the finals, Israel beat Slovenia 14-0. During the C-Level finals stage, the top two teams move on to the B-Level qualification. As the first-place finisher, Israel moved on to B-Level qualification.

2016 B-level qualifier 
After qualifying for the B-Level qualifier after finishing in first place during the C-Level qualifier, Israel competed in the Group A. The top team from each of the two groups would move on to the tournament. With Israel placing third in their group, they were eliminated. Israel started the round with victories over Belarus, Poland and Austria, before losing to Lithuania and Sweden. Despite outscoring their opponents 44-26, Israel was eliminated from the tournament, as Sweden and Austria went 4-1, leaving Israel one game back from advancing.

Source: 

Source:

2019 European Baseball Championship

Based on Team Israel's performance in the 2016 competition, Israel did not need to compete in the C-Level qualifier and competed instead in the B-Level qualifier in 2017. Israel played in Pool 1, in Belgrade, Serbia, from 24 to 29 July 2018. During the tournament, Israel played Switzerland, Bulgaria, Austria, Greece, and Serbia. They went 3-2, which was enough to qualify them for the group championship game against Austria, which they lost 12-2.

They were then sent to another group stage with teams from the C stage and other teams that did not yet qualify. They were assigned to Pool B, which featured 12 teams competing in two groups of 6. The two group winners faced off in a playoff for the last qualifying spot for the 2019 European Championship. In their pool, Team Israel competed against Russia, Ireland, Serbia, Bulgaria, and Greece.

The team played in the 2019 European Baseball Championship - B-Pool in early July 2019 in Blagoevgrad, Bulgaria, winning all of five of its games and advancing to the playoffs against Team Lithuania in the 2019 Playoff Series at the end of July 2019 which it won and thus qualified for the last qualifying spot for the 2019 European Baseball Championship.

In preparation for Baseball at the 2020 Summer Olympics, 10 American baseball players made Aliyah in 2018 in order to qualify under the citizenship requirement for the 2019 European Baseball Championships and the Olympics. The players were Corey Baker, Gabe Cramer, Blake Gailen, Joey Wagman, Alex Katz, Eric Brodkowitz, Jonathan de Marte, Jon Moscot, Jeremy Wolf (who lives in Tel Aviv), and Zack Weiss. They were followed in 2019 by Danny Valencia, Ty Kelly, Nick Rickles, Ben Wanger, and Jeremy Bleich.

In Round 1 of the 2019 European Baseball Championship, Israel went 4-1 (defeating the Czech Republic, Sweden, Germany, and Great Britain while losing to the Netherlands). The team thereby advanced to the Championship's eight-team playoffs, with Mitch Glasser leading all Championship batters in runs with 7, and Blake Gailen tied with Germany's Marco Cardoso for the lead in hits, with 8. In the Championship playoffs, Israel defeated Team France in the quarterfinals, lost to Team Italy in the semi-finals, and came in fourth.

B Pool Final

2019 Playoff Series
Israel won the best-of-three playoff series, and thus qualified for the 2019 European Baseball Championship. The playoff host was Lithuania.

Pool A

Play-Offs
Quarter Finals:

2021 European Baseball Championship

Group stage

Play-offs

Quarter-finals

Semi-finals

Final

See also
Israel at the World Baseball Classic

References

European Baseball Championship
European Baseball Championship